is a Goemon game developed by Konami Computer Entertainment Kobe and released for the Game Boy Color on December 16, 1999.

Gameplay 
The gameplay is similar to the other RPGs in the series, in which the player controls their party from an overhead map and explores each area getting quests and items in order to advance the main plot. While they control a party, combat is strictly one-on-one, as the game attempts to join the Pokémon craze with "dueling" combat between individual monsters. Additionally, the player can capture and train the monsters they defeat, and even upgrade them or merge them with other creatures to obtain additional powers. The game can also connect with the similarly-themed Mononoke Sugoroku for the N64, in order to transfer and exchange monsters between both titles.

References

1999 video games
Game Boy Color games
Game Boy Color-only games
Ganbare Goemon games
Japan-exclusive video games
Video games developed in Japan

Single-player video games
Japanese role-playing video games